FNX may refer to:

 First Nations Experience (FNX), a non-profit television network in San Bernardino, California
 FN FNX, a model of autoloading semi-automatic pistol available in various calibers
 Quadra FNX Mining, a mining company based out of Toronto

See also
 WFNX (disambiguation), a call sign that has been held by several radio stations in the United States